Vest (English: West) is a development region in Romania created in 1998. As with the other development regions, it does not have any administrative powers. Its primary functions are coordinating regional development projects and managing funds from the European Union.

Counties
The Vest region is made up of the following counties:
Arad
Caraș-Severin
Hunedoara
Timiș

See also
Development regions of Romania
Nomenclature of Territorial Units for Statistics

References

Development regions of Romania